Employeeship (or Medarbetarskap in Swedish) is an approach to developing a culture of ownership and responsibility in an organisation. The philosophy has been adopted and researched most notably in Sweden.

Employeeship is a process where the traditional thinking in regards to leadership and subordination in hierarchy is abandoned. The traditional model is replaced by a mindset of partnership, a relationship where both managers and employees take ownership over their work situation. The main objective is to achieve a working environment that stimulates involvement among employees and managers. Managers develop their skills in facilitation, involving, revealing and learn to make better use of their employees’ knowledge, ideas and initiative.

One of the insights that organisations embarking on this approach uncover is that the characteristics often expected and valued in leaders are identical to co-workers and colleagues. Therefore, an organisation that embarks on developing employeeship engages the whole workforce, not just the leadership community. Research (see below) shows an increase in the levels of openness, honesty, taking responsibility and increases trust.

The Elements of Employeeship
The key to this approach is for teams to be able to have transparent conversations with their "leader" regarding things that are not normally discussed in the work setting, subjects such as: the meaning of loyalty; openness and transparency; the meaning of work and how it fits in with our lives; relationships between us in the team; responsibility, accountability and taking initiative; the service we offer others.

Typically the discussions follow pre-designed questions so that deeper exploration can occur.

References

External links
 Case study of employeeship at Swedish Rail (SJ) 

Human resource management